Globularia meridionalis is a plant species in the family Plantaginaceae. It is a perennial plant. It has a dark evergreen foliage and bright blue spherical flowerheads.

meridionalis